Hilliard Darby High School is the second high school in the Hilliard City School District in Hilliard, Ohio, United States. It is one of three high schools in the district, along with Hilliard Davidson High School and Hilliard Bradley High School. The school is located at 4200 Leppert Road, just north of Hilliard Heritage Middle School. Its mascot is the Panther and the school's colors are Carolina blue, black, and white.

The current principal is Matt Middleton. He is Hilliard Darby's fifth principal, following Jeffrey R. Reinhard, David J. Stewart, Ryan McClure, and Joyce Brickley. Stewart moved to Hilliard Bradley High School upon its opening, and is now the superintendent for the Hilliard City School District. Former principal Joyce Brickley moved to Hilliard Davidson High School to fill in for Aaron Cookson.

Darby opened in the 1997-1998 school year, and despite a reputed capacity of 1,800, it held over 2,200 students during the 2008-2009 school year. The enrollment is once again below capacity due to the opening of Bradley, the district's third high school, in the fall of 2009.

Athletics

State championships

 Softball - 2000 
 Boys' volleyball - 2013, 2015

Notable alumni
 Jeremy Ebert – retired wide receiver of the NFL
 Taylor Price – wide receiver for the Seattle Seahawks of the NFL
 Cory Michael Smith - actor, star of the HBO miniseries Olive Kitteridge and the FOX series Gotham
 Ethan Tracy - professional golfer

See also
Hilliard City School District
Hilliard Memorial Middle School
Hilliard Weaver Middle School
Hilliard Heritage Middle School

References

External links
 Hilliard City School District Official Website
 Hilliard Darby High School Official Website

High schools in Franklin County, Ohio
Public high schools in Ohio
Hilliard, Ohio
1997 establishments in Ohio